"You Can't Be a Beacon If Your Light Don't Shine" is a song written by Marty Cooper, and recorded by American country music artist Donna Fargo.  It was released in May 1974 as the first single from the album Miss Donna Fargo.  The song was Fargo's fifth number one on the U.S. country singles chart. The single spent a single week at number one and a total of eleven weeks on the chart.

Chart performance

References

1974 singles
Donna Fargo songs
Dot Records singles
1974 songs